The 1912 All-Western college football team consists of American football players selected to the All-Western teams chosen by various selectors for the 1912 college football season.

All-Western selections

Ends
 Joseph Hoeffel, Wisconsin (Ax, ECP-1, WE-1)
 Miller Pontius, Michigan (Ax, ECP-1, FY [tackle], WE-1)
 Roy Torbet, Michigan (FY)
 John Vruwink, Chicago (FY)
 Harold R. Mulligan, Nebraska (WE-2)
 Andrew N. Johnson, Northwestern (WE-2)

Tackles
 Bob Butler, Wisconsin (Ax, ECP-1, FY, WE-1) (CFHOF)
 Jim Trickey, Iowa (ECP-1, WE-2)
 Donald B. Barricklow, Ohio State (WE-1)
 Halstead Carpeneter, Chicago (WE-2)

Guards
 Ray Keeler, Wisconsin (Ax, ECP-1, WE-1)
 Clark Shaughnessy, Minnesota (Ax [tackle], ECP-1) (CFHOF)
 Fred Ebert, Wabash (WE-1)
 Clem Quinn, Michigan (FY)
 Russell J. McCurdy, Michigan Agricultural (FY)
 Henry Hanson, Iowa (WE-2)
 Ernest Allmendinger, Michigan (WE-2)

Centers
 Paul Des Jardien, Chicago (Ax, ECP-1, WE-1) (CFHOF)
 Al Feeney, Notre Dame (WE-2)
 George C. Paterson, Michigan (Ax [guard], FY)

Quarterbacks
 Edmund Gillette, Wisconsin (Ax, ECP-1, FY, WE-1)
 Gus Dorais, Notre Dame (WE-2) (CFHOF)

Halfbacks
 James B. Craig, Michigan (Ax, ECP-1, FY, WE-1)
 John VanRiper, Wisconsin (Ax, ECP-1, WE-1)
 Elmer Oliphant, Purdue (WE-2)
 William McAlmon, Minnesota (FY, WE-2)

Fullbacks 
 Ray Eichenlaub, Notre Dame (WE-1) (CFHOF)
 Alvin Tandberg, Wisconsin (Ax, ECP-1, WE-2)
 George C. Thomson, Michigan (FY)

Key
Bold = consensus choice by a majority of the selectors

Ax = George W. Axelson, Chicago football writer

ECP = E. C. Patterson for Collier's Weekly

FY = Fielding H. Yost, head football coach at University of Michigan, in the Detroit Free Press

WE = Walter Eckersall for the Chicago Tribune

CFHOF = College Football Hall of Fame

See also
1912 College Football All-America Team

References

1912 Western Conference football season
All-Western college football teams